James Baillie (born 27 March 1996) is an English footballer who plays for Ashton United. He previously played in the Football League for Crewe Alexandra.

Career
Baillie began his career with Crewe Alexandra and signed a professional contract with the club in May 2014. He made his Football League debut on 9 August 2014 in a 2–1 defeat away at Fleetwood Town.

In March 2016 he joined Nantwich Town on loan.

in September 2016 he signed for Curzon Ashton. On 30 October 2018, he suffered a broken leg in a fixture against Southport and missed almost a year. Before his return to Curzon Ashton first team action, he had loan spells with Abbey Hey and Mossley to help with his recovery.

After spending four years at Curzon, he signed for Northern Premier League Premier Division side Warrington Town, making nine appearances before the 2020–21 campaign was curtailed. He re-signed for another season in July 2021.

In June 2022, Baillie joined Ashton United.

Career statistics

References

External links

1996 births
Living people
English footballers
Footballers from Warrington
Crewe Alexandra F.C. players
Nantwich Town F.C. players
Curzon Ashton F.C. players
Warrington Town F.C. players
Ashton United F.C. players
English Football League players
National League (English football) players
Northern Premier League players
Association football defenders